Utena County is one of ten counties in Lithuania. It is the country's most sparsely populated county. On 1 July 2010, the county administration was abolished. Since that date, Utena County remains as the territorial and statistical unit.

History
Utena is one of the oldest settlements in Lithuania and is mentioned in historical chronicles as early as in 1261.

Municipalities
It is divided into six municipalities:

Economy
The county has a well-developed network of roads. Main branches of economy are textile, food and timber processing, beer and wine production, power engineering.

Tourism
Utena County is the second most popular tourism destination in Lithuania (after the seaside). Approximately 31% of territory is covered with forests. There are 1002 lakes in the county. They are connected by rivers and provide good opportunities for water tourism. One of the biggest tourism attractions is Aukštaitija National Park. In addition, the county has six other regional parks. There are a number of unique places of interest that can be found only in Utena county, e.g., Asveja, the longest lake in Lithuania and Lake Tauragnas, the deepest one; Horse Museum, Lithuanian Museum of Ancient Beekeeping, Lithuanian Museum of Ethnocosmology, narrow gauge railway, a burial mound exposition, an exhibition of stone dust pictures.

References

External links
Social and demographic characteristics of Utena County
Economy of Utena County
Environment of Utena County

 
Counties of Lithuania